Igor Anatolievich Stelnov (Russian: Игорь Анатольевич Стельнов "Igor Styelnov") (b. February 12, 1963 in Moscow, Russian SFSR, Soviet Union - d. March 24, 2009 in Moscow, Russia) was a Russian ice hockey player who played in the Soviet Hockey League.  He played for HC CSKA Moscow.  He was inducted into the Russian and Soviet Hockey Hall of Fame in 1984. Olympic and World champion. 8-times champion of USSR (1982, 1983, 1984, 1985, 1986, 1988, 1989, 1990).

On the international stage, Stelnov won two gold medals (1984, 1988) in the Olympics, and one gold (1986) and one silver (1987) in the World Championships.

Stelnov died on March 24, 2009 after a long illness.

Career statistics

Regular season and playoffs

International

External links

 Russian and Soviet Hockey Hall of Fame bio

1963 births
2009 deaths
HC CSKA Moscow players
HC Khimik Voskresensk players
Ice hockey players at the 1984 Winter Olympics
Ice hockey players at the 1988 Winter Olympics
Medalists at the 1984 Winter Olympics
Medalists at the 1988 Winter Olympics
Olympic gold medalists for the Soviet Union
Olympic ice hockey players of the Soviet Union
Olympic medalists in ice hockey
Russian ice hockey defencemen
Soviet ice hockey defencemen
Ice hockey people from Moscow